Gregory of Nazianzus (Grēgorios ho Nazianzēnos;  – 25 January 390), also known as Gregory the Theologian or Gregory Nazianzen, was a 4th-century Archbishop of Constantinople and theologian. He is widely considered the most accomplished rhetorical stylist of the patristic age. As a classically trained orator and philosopher, he infused Hellenism into the early church, establishing the paradigm of Byzantine theologians and church officials.

Gregory made a significant impact on the shape of Trinitarian theology among both Greek and Latin-speaking theologians, and he is remembered as the "Trinitarian Theologian". Much of his theological work continues to influence modern theologians, especially in regard to the relationship among the three Persons of the Trinity. Along with the brothers Basil the Great and Gregory of Nyssa, he is known as one of the Cappadocian Fathers.

Gregory of Nazianzus is a saint in both Eastern and Western Christianity. In the Catholic Church he is numbered among the Doctors of the Church; in the Eastern Orthodox Church and the Eastern Catholic Churches he is revered as one of the Three Holy Hierarchs, along with Basil the Great and John Chrysostom. He is considered one of the Great Fathers in both Eastern and Western Christianity. He was considered the patron saint of Kotromanić dynasty and medieval Bosnia during the first half of the 15th century, while Saint George, the miracle-worker, has been the patron saint since at least mid-13th century, although confirmed by the papacy much later in 1461. St. Gregory the Great was also considered the patron of both the state and dynasty in the late 15th century.

He is also one of only three men in the life of the Orthodox Church who have been officially designated "Theologian" by epithet, the other two being John the Theologian (the Evangelist), and Symeon the New Theologian.

Biography

Early life and education
Gregory was born to Greek parents in the family estate of Karbala outside the village of Arianzus, near Nazianzus, in southwest Cappadocia. His parents, Gregory and Nonna, were wealthy land-owners. In AD 325 Nonna converted her husband, a Hypsistarian, to Christianity; he was subsequently ordained as bishop of Nazianzus in 328 or 329. The young Gregory and his brother, Caesarius, first studied at home with their uncle Amphylokhios. Gregory went on to study advanced rhetoric and philosophy in Nazianzus, Caesarea, Alexandria, and Athens. On the way to Athens his ship encountered a violent storm, and the terrified Gregory prayed to Christ that if He would deliver him, he would dedicate his life to His service. While at Athens, he developed a close friendship with his fellow student Basil of Caesarea, and also made the acquaintance of Flavius Claudius Julianus, who would later become the emperor known as Julian the Apostate. In Athens, Gregory studied under the famous rhetoricians Himerius and Proaeresius. He may have been baptized there, or shortly after his return to Cappadocia.

Priesthood
In 361 Gregory returned to Nazianzus and was ordained a presbyter by his father's wish, who wanted him to assist with caring for local Christians. The younger Gregory, who had been considering a monastic existence, resented his father's decision to force him to choose between priestly services and a solitary existence, calling it an "act of tyranny". Leaving home after a few days, he met his friend Basil at Annesoi, where the two lived as ascetics. However, Basil urged him to return home to assist his father, which he did for the next year. Arriving at Nazianzus, Gregory found the local Christian community split by theological differences and his father accused of heresy by local monks. Gregory helped to heal the division through a combination of personal diplomacy and oratory.

By this time Emperor Julian had publicly declared himself in opposition to Christianity. In response to the emperor's rejection of the Christian faith, Gregory composed his Invectives Against Julian between 362 and 363. Invectives asserts that Christianity will overcome imperfect rulers such as Julian through love and patience. This process as described by Gregory is the public manifestation of the process of deification (theosis), which leads to a spiritual elevation and mystical union with God. Julian resolved, in late 362, to vigorously prosecute Gregory and his other Christian critics; however, the emperor perished the following year during a campaign against the Persians. With the death of the emperor, Gregory and the Eastern churches were no longer under the threat of persecution, as the new emperor Jovian was an avowed Christian and supporter of the church.

Gregory spent the next few years combating Arianism, which threatened to divide the region of Cappadocia. In this tense environment, Gregory interceded on behalf of his friend Basil with Bishop Eusebius of Caesarea (Mazaca). The two friends then entered a period of close fraternal cooperation as they participated in a great rhetorical contest of the Caesarean church precipitated by the arrival of accomplished Arian theologians and rhetors. In the subsequent public debates, presided over by agents of the Emperor Valens, Gregory and Basil emerged triumphant. This success confirmed for both Gregory and Basil that their futures lay in administration of the Church. Basil, who had long displayed inclinations to the episcopacy, was elected bishop of the see of Caesarea in Cappadocia in 370.

Episcopate in Sasima and Nazianzus
Gregory was ordained Bishop of Sasima in 372 by Basil. Basil created this see in order to strengthen his position in his dispute with Anthimus, bishop of Tyana. The ambitions of Gregory's father to have his son rise in the Church hierarchy and the insistence of his friend Basil convinced Gregory to accept this position despite his reservations. Gregory would later refer to his episcopal ordination as forced upon him by his strong-willed father and Basil. Describing his new bishopric, Gregory lamented how it was nothing more than an "utterly dreadful, pokey little hole; a paltry horse-stop on the main road ... devoid of water, vegetation, or the company of gentlemen ... this was my Church of Sasima!" He made little effort to administer his new diocese, complaining to Basil that he preferred instead to pursue a contemplative life.

By late 372 Gregory returned to Nazianzus to assist his dying father with the administration of his diocese. This strained his relationship with Basil, who insisted that Gregory resume his post at Sasima. Gregory retorted that he had no intention to continue to play the role of pawn to advance Basil's interests. He instead focused his attention on his new duties as coadjutor of Nazianzus. It was here that Gregory preached the first of his great episcopal orations.

Following the deaths of his mother and father in 374, Gregory continued to administer the Diocese of Nazianzus but refused to be named bishop. Donating most of his inheritance to the needy, he lived an austere existence. At the end of 375 he withdrew to a monastery at Seleukia, living there for three years. Near the end of this period his friend Basil died. Although Gregory's health did not permit him to attend the funeral, he wrote a heartfelt letter of condolence to Basil's brother, Gregory of Nyssa, and composed twelve memorial poems dedicated to the memory of his departed friend. (The Greek Anthology, book I epigram 86 and book VIII epigrams 2–11).

Gregory at Constantinople
Upon the death of Emperor Valens in 378, the accession of Theodosius I, a steadfast supporter of Nicene orthodoxy, was good news to those who wished to purge Constantinople of Arian and Apollinarian domination. The exiled Nicene party gradually returned to the city. From his deathbed, Basil reminded them of Gregory's capabilities and likely recommended his friend to champion the Trinitarian cause in Constantinople.

In 379, the Antioch synod and its archbishop, Meletios, asked Gregory to go to Constantinople to lead a theological campaign to win over that city to Nicene orthodoxy. After much hesitation, Gregory agreed. His cousin Theodosia offered him a villa for his residence; Gregory immediately transformed much of it into a church, naming it Anastasia, "a scene for the resurrection of the faith". From this little chapel he delivered five powerful discourses on Nicene doctrine, explaining the nature of the Trinity and the unity of the Godhead. Refuting the Eunomion denial of the Holy Spirit's divinity, Gregory offered this argument:

Gregory's homilies were well received and attracted ever-growing crowds to Anastasia. Fearing his popularity, his opponents decided to strike. On the vigil of Easter in 379, an Arian mob burst into his church during worship services, wounding Gregory and killing another bishop. Escaping the mob, Gregory next found himself betrayed by his erstwhile friend, the philosopher Maximus the Cynic. Maximus, who was in secret alliance with Peter, bishop of Alexandria, attempted to seize Gregory's position and have himself ordained bishop of Constantinople. Shocked, Gregory decided to resign his office, but the faction faithful to him induced him to stay and ejected Maximus. This episode left Gregory embarrassed, and exposed him to criticism as a provincial simpleton unable to cope with the intrigues of the imperial city.

Affairs in Constantinople remained confused as Gregory's position was still unofficial, and Arian priests yet occupied many important churches. The arrival of the emperor Theodosius in 380 settled matters in Gregory's favor. The emperor, determined to eliminate Arianism, expelled Bishop Demophilus. Gregory was subsequently enthroned as bishop of Constantinople at the Basilica of the Apostles, replacing Demophilus.

Second Ecumenical Council and retirement to Nazianzus

Theodosius wanted to further unify the entire empire behind the orthodox position and decided to convene a church council to resolve matters of faith and discipline. Gregory was of similar mind in wishing to unify Christianity. In the spring of 381 they convened the Second Ecumenical Council in Constantinople, which was attended by 150 Eastern bishops. After the death of the presiding bishop, Meletius of Antioch, Gregory was selected to lead the council. Hoping to reconcile the West with the East, he offered to recognize Paulinus as Patriarch of Antioch. The Egyptian and Macedonian bishops who had supported Maximus's ordination arrived late for the council. Once there, they refused to recognise Gregory's position as head of the church of Constantinople, arguing that his transfer from the See of Sasima was canonically illegitimate.

Gregory was physically exhausted and worried that he was losing the confidence of the bishops and the emperor. Rather than press his case and risk further division, he decided to resign his office: "Let me be as the Prophet Jonah! I was responsible for the storm, but I would sacrifice myself for the salvation of the ship. Seize me and throw me ... I was not happy when I ascended the throne, and gladly would I descend it." He shocked the council with his surprise resignation and then delivered a dramatic speech to Theodosius asking to be released from his offices. The emperor, moved by his words, applauded, commended his labor, and granted his resignation. The Council asked him to appear once more for a farewell ritual and celebratory orations. Gregory used this occasion to deliver a final address ( 42) and then departed.

Returning to his homeland of Cappadocia, Gregory once again resumed his position as bishop of Nazianzus. He spent the next year combating the local Apollinarian heretics and struggling with periodic illness. He also began composing De Vita Sua, his autobiographical poem. By the end of 383 he found his health too feeble to cope with episcopal duties. Gregory established Eulalius as bishop of Nazianzus and then withdrew into the solitude of Arianzum. After enjoying six peaceful years in retirement at his family estate, he died on 25 January in 390.

Gregory faced stark choices throughout his life: Should he pursue studies as a rhetor or philosopher? Would a monastic life be more appropriate than public ministry? Was it better to blaze his own path or follow the course mapped for him by his father and Basil? Gregory's writings illuminate the conflicts which both tormented and motivated him. Biographers suggest that it was this dialectic which defined him, forged his character, and inspired his search for meaning and truth.

Legacy

Theological and other works
Gregory's most significant theological contributions arose from his defense of the doctrine of the Trinity. He is especially noted for his contributions to the field of pneumatology—that is, theology concerning the nature of the Holy Spirit. In this regard, Gregory is the first to use the idea of procession to describe the relationship between the Spirit and the Godhead: "The Holy Spirit is truly Spirit, coming forth from the Father indeed but not after the manner of the Son, for it is not by generation but by procession, since I must coin a word for the sake of clearness." Although Gregory does not fully develop the concept, the idea of procession would shape most later thought about the Holy Spirit.

He emphasized that Jesus did not cease to be God when he became a man, nor did he lose any of his divine attributes when he took on human nature. Furthermore, Gregory asserted that Christ was fully human, including a full human soul. He also proclaimed the eternality of the Holy Spirit, saying that the Holy Spirit's actions were somewhat hidden in the Old Testament but much clearer since the ascension of Jesus into Heaven and the descent of the Holy Spirit at the feast of Pentecost.

In contrast to the Neo-Arian belief that the Son is anomoios, or "unlike" the Father, and with the Semi-Arian assertion that the Son is homoiousios, or "like" the Father, Gregory and his fellow Cappadocians maintained the Nicaean doctrine of homoousia, or consubstantiality of the Son with the Father. The Cappadocian Fathers asserted that God's nature is unknowable to man; helped to develop the framework of hypostases, or three persons united in a single Godhead; illustrated how Jesus is the eikon of the Father; and explained the concept of theosis, the belief that all Christians can be assimilated with God in "imitation of the incarnate Son as the divine model."

Some of Gregory's theological writings suggest that, like his friend Gregory of Nyssa, he may have supported some form of the doctrine of apocatastasis, the belief that God will bring all of creation into harmony with the Kingdom of Heaven. This led Philip Schaff and late-nineteenth century Christian universalists such as J. W. Hanson to describe Gregory's theology as universalist. This view of Gregory is also held by some modern theologians such as John Sachs, who said that Gregory had "leanings" toward apocatastasis, but in a "cautious, undogmatic" way. However, it is not clear or universally accepted that Gregory held to the doctrine of apocatastasis.

Apart from the several theological discourses, Gregory was also one of the most important early Christian men of letters, a very accomplished orator, even perhaps one of the greatest of his time. Gregory was also a very prolific poet who wrote theological, moral, and biographical poems. The book VIII of the Greek Anthology contains exclusively 254 epigrams of his.

Influence
Gregory's great nephew Nichobulos served as his literary executor, preserving and editing many of his writings. A cousin, Eulalios, published several of Gregory's more noteworthy works in 391. By 400, Rufinius began translating his orations into Latin. As Gregory's works circulated throughout the empire they influenced theological thought. His orations were cited as authoritative by the First Council of Ephesus in 431. By 451 he was designated Theologus, or Theologian by the Council of Chalcedon – a title held by no others save John the Apostle and Symeon the New Theologian (949–1022 AD). He is widely quoted by Eastern Orthodox theologians and highly regarded as a defender of the Christian faith. His contributions to Trinitarian theology are also influential and often cited in the Western churches. Paul Tillich credits Gregory of Nazianzus for having "created the definitive formulae for the doctrine of the trinity". Additionally, the Liturgy of St Gregory the Theologian in use by the Coptic Church is named after him.

Relics
Following his death, Gregory was buried at Nazianzus. His relics, consisting of portions of his body and clothing, were transferred to Constantinople in 950, into the Church of the Holy Apostles. Part of the relics were taken from Constantinople by Crusaders during the Fourth Crusade, in 1204, and ended up in Rome. On 27 November 2004, those relics, along with those of John Chrysostom, were returned to Constantinople (now Istanbul) by Pope John Paul II, with the Vatican retaining a small portion of both. The relics are now enshrined in the Patriarchal Cathedral of St. George in the Fanar.

Death
During the six years of life which remained to him after his final retirement to his birthplace, Gregory composed the greater part of his copious poetical works. These include a valuable autobiographical poem of nearly 2,000 lines; about one hundred other shorter poems relating to his past career; and a large number of epitaphs, epigrams, and epistles to well-known people during that era. The poems that he wrote that dealt with his personal affairs refer to the continuous illness and severe sufferings (physical and spiritual) which assailed him during his last years. In the tiny plot of ground at Arianzus, all that remained to him of his rich inheritance was by a fountain near which there was a shady walk. Gregory retired here to spend his days as a hermit. It was during this time that he decided to write theological discourses and poetry of both a religious and an autobiographical nature. He would receive occasional visits from intimate friends, as well as visits from strangers who were attracted to his retreat by his large reputation for sanctity and learning. He died about 25 January 390, although the exact date of his death is unknown.

Feast days
Gregory of Nazianzus is celebrated on different days across Christianity.

 2 Jan.: The Catholic Church and the Church of England celebrate Gregory's feast on 2 Jan.
 10 Jan.:  The Lutheran Church–Missouri Synod commemorates Gregory, along with Basil the Great and Gregory of Nyssa (the Cappadocian Fathers) on 10 January.
 25 & 30 Jan: The Eastern Orthodox Church and the Eastern Catholic Churches celebrate two feast days in Gregory's honor. 25 January is his primary feast; 30 January, known as the feast of the Three Great Hierarchs, commemorates him along with John Chrysostom and Basil of Caesarea.
 9 May: The Episcopal Church celebrates Gregory's feast on 9 May.
 14 June: The Evangelical Lutheran Church in America commemorates Gregory of Nazianzus together with his friends Basil the Great and Gregory of Nyssa on 14 June.
 Armenian Dates: The Armenian Apostolic Church devotes two days each year to Gregory. He is commemorated together with eleven other doctors of the Church on the Saturday before the feast of the Discovery of the Holy Cross (which is observed on the Sunday closest to 26 October. The Armenian Church calendar also has a feast day dedicated solely to Gregory. This falls either on the Saturday before the fourth Sunday of the Transfiguration, or if that day falls during the feast of the Assumption, on the Saturday before the third Sunday after the Nativity.

See also
 List of Ecumenical Patriarchs of Constantinople
 Ecumenical Patriarch of Constantinople

References

Citations

Sources 

 
 
 McGuckin, John A. St. Gregory of Nazianzus: An Intellectual Biography. Crestwood, NY: 2001, St. Vladimir's Seminar Press. 
 Migne, J.P. (General Editor). Cursus Completus Patrologiae Graecae. Volumes 35–38. Paris: 1857–66.
 The Orthodox Church of America website article on St. Gregory the Theologian. Retrieved 2 May 2007.
 Ruether, Rosemary Radford. Gregory of Nazianzus. Oxford: 1969, Oxford University Press.
 Turner, H.E.W. and Francis Young, "Procession(s)" in The Westminster Dictionary of Christian Theology, ed. A. Richardson & J. Bowden. Philadelphia: 1983, Westminster Press, 1983.
 Gregory of Nazianzus, translated by Martha Vinson, Select Orations, Catholic University of America Press, 2003. Link.

Further reading 

 Michael Azkoul, "St. Gregory the Theologian: Poetry and Faith," Patristic and Byzantine Review 14.1–3 (1995): 59–68.
 
 Brian Daley, ed., Gregory Nazianzen. Early Church Fathers. London: Routledge, an imprint of Taylor & Francis Books, 2005. , pp. 192.
 K. Demoen, "Biblical vs. Non-Biblical Vocabulary in Gregorius Nazianzenus; a Quantitative Approach," Informatique 2 (1988–89): 243–53.
 Elena Ene D-Vasilescu, "Generation (γενεά) in Gregory Nazianzen's poem on the Son", Akropolis, vol. 1 (2017), pp. 169–184.
 J. Egan, "Gregory of Nazianzus and the Logos Doctrine," J. Plevnic, ed., Word and Spirit: Essays in Honor of David Michael Stanley. Willowdale, ON: 1975. pp. 281–322.
 Anna-Stina Ellverson, The Dual Nature of Man: A Study in the Theological Anthropology of Gregory of Nazianzus. Acta Universitatis Upsaliensis, 1981. . {Amazon.com}
 Gerald Fitzpatrick, "St Gregory Nazianzen: Education for Salvation," Patristic and Byzantine Review 10.1–2 (1991): 47–55.
 R.C. Gregg, Consolation Philosophy: Greek and Christian Paideia in Basil and the Two Gregories. Washington, DC: Catholic University of America Press, 1975. . {Amazon.com}
 Edward R. Hardy, ed. Christology of the Later Fathers, J. Baillie et al., eds. Library of Christian Classics, Vol. 3. Philadelphia: Westminster, 1995. Pbk. 
 Carol Harrison & Brian Daley (Editor). Gregory Nazianzen. Routledge, 1999. 
 V. Harrison, "Some Aspects of Saint Gregory (Nazianzen) the Theologian's Soteriology," Greek Orthodox Theological Review 34 (1989): 19–43/11–8.
 Susan R. Holman, "Healing the Social Leper in Gregory of Nyssa's and Gregory of Nazianzus's peri philoptochias," Harvard Theological Review 92.3 (1999): 283–309.
 M. Edmund Hussey,"The Theology of the Holy Spirit in the Writings of St. Gregory of Nazianzus," Diakonia 14.3 (1979): 224–233.
 Anne Karahan, "The Impact of Cappadocian Theology on Byzantine Aesthetics: Gregory of Nazianzus on the Unity and Singularity of Christ". In: The Ecumenical Legacy of the Cappadocians, pp. 159–184. Ed. N. Dumitraşcu. New York: Palgrave Macmillan 2015. .
 George A. Kennedy, Greek Rhetoric Under Christian Emperors. Princeton: Princeton University Press, 1983. . pp. 215–239. {Amazon.com}
 Vasiliki Limberis, ."'Religion' as the Cipher for Identity: The Cases of Emperor Julian, Libanius, and Gregory Nazianzus," Harvard Theological Review 93.4 (2000): 373–400.
 N.B. McLynn, "The Other Olympias: Gregory of Nazianzen and the Family of Vitalianus," ZAC 2 (1998): 227–46.
 Ruth Majercik, "A Reminiscence of the Chaldean Oracles at Gregory of Nazianzus, Or. 29,2," Vigiliae Christianae 52.3 (1998): 286–292.
 P.J. Maritz, "Logos Articulation in Gregory of Nazianzus," Acta Patristica et Byzantina 6 (1995): 99–108.
 E.P. Meijuring, "The Doctrine of the Will and the Trinity in the Orations of Gregory of Nazianzus," Nederlands Theologisch Tijdschrift 27.3 (1973): 224–34.
 Celica Milovanovic-Barham, "Gregory of Nazianzus: Ars Poetica (In suos versus: Carmen 2.1.39)," Journal of Early Christian Studies 5.4 (1997): 497–510.
 H. Musurillo, "The Poetry of Gregory of Nazianzus," Thought 45 (1970): 45–55.
 T.A. Noble, "Gregory Nazianzen's Use of Scripture in Defence of the Deity of the Spirit," Tyndale Bulletin 39 (1988): 101–23.
 F.W. Norris, "Of Thorns and Roses: The Logic of Belief in Gregory of Nazianzen," Church History, Vol. 53 (1984): 455–64.
 F.W. Norris, "The Tetragrammaton in Gregory Nazianzen (Or. 30.17)," Vigiliae Christianae 43 (1989): 339–44.
 F.W. Norris, Faith Gives Fullness to Reasoning: The Five Theological Orations of Gregory Nazianzen. Supplements to Vigiliae Christianae, Vol 13. Leiden: Brill, 1990. . p. 314. {Amazon.com}
 Jay Wesley Richards, "Can a Male Savior Save Women?: Gregory of Nazianzus on the Logos' Assumption of Human Nature," Christian Scholar's Review 28.1 (1998): 42–57.
 K. Skurat, "St. Gregory of Nazianzus on Philosophy and Knowledge of God," Journal of Moscow Patriarchate 10 (October 1989): 57–62.
 B. K. Storin, Self-Portrait in Three Colors: Gregory of Nazianzus's Epistolary Autobiography, Christianity in Late Antiquity 6 (Oakland: University of California Press, 2019).
 B. K. Storin, trans. Gregory of Nazianzus's Letter Collection: The Complete Translation, Christianity in Late Antiquity 7 (Oakland: University of California Press, 2019).
 Frank Thielman, "The Place of the Apocalypse in the Canon of St Gregory Nazianzen," Tyndale Bulletin 49.1 (1998): 155–7.
 Steven Peter Tsichlis, "The Nature of Theology in the Theological Orations of St. Gregory Nazianzus," Diakonia 16.3 (1981): 238–46.
 Raymond Van Dam, "Self-Representation in the Will of Gregory of Nazianzus," Journal of Theological Studies 46.1 (1995): 118–48.
 Kenneth Paul Wesche, "The Union of God and Man in Jesus Christ in the Thought of Gregory of Nazianzus," St. Vladimir's Theological Quarterly 28.2 (1984): 83–98.
 Donald F. Winslow, "Gregory of Nazianzus and Love for the Poor," Anglican Theological Review 47 (1965): 348–59.
 Donald F. Winslow, The Dynamics of Salvation: A Study in Gregory of Nazianzus''. Cambridge, MA: North American Patristic Society, 1979. .

External links

 Works of Gregory Nazianzus translated into English
 NAZIANZOS: Centre for the study of Gregory of Nazianzus at the Université catholique de Louvain
 Colonnade Statue in St Peter's Square
 
 

329 births
390 deaths
4th-century Archbishops of Constantinople
4th-century Christian mystics
4th-century Christian saints
4th-century Christian theologians
4th-century philosophers
4th-century poets
4th-century Romans
4th-century writers
Cappadocian Greeks
Christianity and Hellenistic philosophy
Church Fathers
Doctors of the Church
Epigrammatists of the Greek Anthology
Greek Christian mystics
Opponents of Arianism
Patristic mystics
Catholic philosophers
Roman-era students in Athens
Saints from Constantinople
Saints from Roman Anatolia
People from Aksaray Province
Anglican saints